Burfjord is a village that is the administrative centre of Kvænangen Municipality in Troms og Finnmark county, Norway. It is home to the municipal council of Kvænangen.

General information 
Burfjord lies on the northern border of Troms County, along the busy European route E6 highway that winds its way through this part of Northern Norway.  The village is located at the end of the Burfjorden, an arm of the Kvænangen fjord.  It is about  straight west of the town of Alta and the Alta Airport.

The services of Burfjord include a bank, a post office, a gas station, a medical office, a nursing home, a dentist, a primary school, grocery shops, and Burfjord Church.  Burfjord's residents are composed of a mix of indigenous Sami people, Kven people, and ethnic Norwegians. Sami tourist stops selling handicrafts are located all around the village.

History 
Burfjord's growth as a town is relatively recent. Prior to 1500, the Kvænangen region was almost entirely inhabited by indigenous Sami peoples, who at some point left the traditional nomadic life of reindeer herding atop the mountain plateau and settled to fish and farm as sjøsame (sea-Sami). The first scouts northward from Trondheim found no southern Norwegians living in or around the area. During the early 18th century, Burfjord and the larger Kvænangen region became inhabited by Norwegians from the south who plied their trade fishing and farming, as well by the Kvæns, Finns who emigrated from the east. Despite the Kvæns remaining a minority, population-wise, they nevertheless gave Kvænangen its namesake. Kvænangen was originally part of the Skjærvøy parish in northern Troms county. Kvænangen became a separate sub-parish in 1861. It was in the 19th century that Burfjord grew in size and is listed as a town. Due to its geographically central location, it was chosen as the capital of Kvæanangen.

References

Villages in Troms
Kvænangen